Lohusuu is a small borough in  Mustvee Parish Jõgeva County, in northeastern Estonia. It was the administrative centre of the Lohusuu Parish. As of 2011 Census, the settlement's population was 317.

Notable people
Otto Wilhelm Masing (1763-1832), linguist

References

Boroughs and small boroughs in Estonia